Richard Prince (born 1949) is an American painter and photographer. In the mid-1970s, Prince made drawings and painterly collages that he has since disowned. His image, Untitled (Cowboy), a rephotographing of a photograph by Sam Abell and appropriated from a cigarette advertisement, was the first rephotograph to be sold for more than $1 million at auction at Christie's New York in 2005. He is regarded as "one of the most revered artists of his generation" according to The New York Times. 
 
Starting in 1977, Prince photographed four photographs which previously appeared in The New York Times. This process of rephotographing continued into 1983, when his work Spiritual America featured Garry Gross's photo of Brooke Shields at the age of ten, standing in a bathtub, as an allusion to precocious sexuality and to the Alfred Stieglitz photograph by the same name.  His Jokes series (beginning 1986) concerns the sexual fantasies and sexual frustrations of white, middle-class America, using stand-up comedy and burlesque humor.

After living in New York City for 25 years, Prince moved to upstate New York. His mini-museum, Second House, purchased by the Guggenheim Museum, was struck by lightning and burned down shortly after the museum purchased the House (which Prince had created for himself), having only stood for six years, from 2001 to 2007. In June 2021, the painting Runaway Nurse from 2005-06 fetched a record-breaking 93,986,000 HKD (12,121,000 USD) at Sotheby's in Hong Kong. Prince now lives and works in New York City.

Early life 
Richard Prince was born on the 6th of August 1949, in the U.S.-controlled Panama Canal Zone, now part of the Republic of Panama. During an interview in 2000 with Julie L. Belcove, he responded to the question of why his parents were in the Zone, by saying "they worked for the government." When asked further if his father was involved in the military, Prince responded, "No, he just worked for the government." The Wall Street Journal later reported that Prince's parents worked for the Office of Strategic Services in the Panama Canal before he was born. Prince later lived in the New England city of Braintree, Massachusetts, a suburb of Boston, and Provincetown on Cape Cod. In 1973, he moved to New York and joined publishing company Time Inc. His job at the Time Inc. library involved providing the company’s various magazines with tear sheets of articles.

Career 
Prince was first interested in the art of the American abstract expressionist Jackson Pollock. "I was very attracted to the idea of someone who was by themselves, fairly antisocial, kind of a loner, someone who was noncollaborative." Prince grew up during the height of Pollock's career, making his work accessible. The 1956 Time magazine article dubbing Pollock "Jack the Dripper" made the thought of pursuing art as career possible. After finishing high school in 1967, Prince set off for Europe at age 18.

He returned home and attended Nasson College in Maine, which he described as without grades or structure. From Maine he moved to Braintree, Massachusetts, and for a brief time lived in Provincetown. Ultimately he was drawn to New York City. Prince has said that his attraction to New York was instigated by the famous photograph of Franz Kline gazing out the window of his 14th Street studio. Prince described the picture as "a man content to be alone, pursuing the outside world from the sanctum of his studio."

Prince's first solo exhibition took place in June 1980 during a residency at the CEPA gallery in Buffalo, New York. His short book Menthol Wars was published as part of the residency. In 1981 Prince had his first West Coast solo exhibition at Jancar Kuhlenschmidt Gallery in Los Angeles. In 1985, he spent four months making art in a rented house in Venice, Los Angeles.

In late 2007, Prince had a retrospective at the Solomon R. Guggenheim Museum, a comprehensive show hung in chronological order along the upward spiraling walls. The show continued onto the Walker Art Center in Minneapolis. Maria Morris Hamburg, the curator of photography at the New York Metropolitan Museum of Art, asserted, "He is absolutely essential to what's going on today, he figured out before anyone else—and in a very precocious manner—how thoroughly pervasive the media is. It's not just an aspect of our lives, but the dominant aspect of our lives."

Prince has built up a large collection of Beat books and papers. Prince owns several copies of On the Road by Jack Kerouac, including one inscribed to Kerouac's mother, one famously read on The Steve Allen Show, the original proof copy of the book and an original galley, as well as the copy owned by Neal Cassady (the Dean Moriarty character in the book), with Cassady’s signature and marginal notes.

Describing his career and methodology in a 2005 New York magazine interview, Prince said, "It's about knocking about in the studio and bumping into things."

Rephotography 
Re-photography uses appropriation as its own focus: artists pull from the works of others and the worlds they depict to create their own work. Appropriation art became popular in the late 1970s. Other appropriation artists such as, Sherrie Levine, Louise Lawler, Vikky Alexander, Cindy Sherman, Barbara Kruger and Mike Bidlo also became prominent in the East Village in the 1980s. This grouping of artists became known as the "Pictures Generation." All of these artists were greatly influenced by the work of John Baldessari and Robert Heinecken, both of whom have worked extensively with found or readymade print photography since the 1960s, Baldessari working mainly with Hollywood film stills and Heineken mainly with magazine advertisements and print pornography. Both artists taught at UCLA and the California Institute for the Arts in Southern California throughout the 1970s, when many of these artists attended school there.

During the early period of his career, Prince worked in Time magazine's tear sheets department. At the end of each work day, he would be left with nothing but the torn out advertising images from the eight or so magazines owned by Time-Life. On the topic of found photographs, Prince said, "Oceans without surfers, cowboys without Marlboros…Even though I’m aware of the classicism of the images. I seem to go after images that I don’t quite believe. And, I try to re-present them even more unbelievably."

Prince had very little experience with photography, but he has said in interviews that all he needed was a subject, the medium would follow, whether it be paint and brush or camera and film. He compared his new method of searching out interesting advertisements to "beachcombing." His first series during this time focused on models, living room furniture, watches, pens, and jewellery.  Pop culture became the focus of his work. Prince described his experience of appropriation thus: "At first it was pretty reckless. Plagiarizing someone else’s photograph, making a new picture effortlessly. Making the exposure, looking through the lens and clicking, felt like an unwelling . . . a whole new history without the old one. It absolutely destroyed any associations I had experienced with putting things together. And of course the whole thing about the naturalness of the film’s ability to appropriate. I always thought it had a lot to do with having a chip on your shoulder."

Controversies

Patrick Cariou copyright infringement suit 

In December 2008, photographer Patrick Cariou filed suit against Prince, Gagosian Gallery, Lawrence Gagosian and Rizzoli International Publications in Federal district court for copyright infringement in work shown at Prince's Canal Zone exhibit at the Gagosian gallery. Prince was charged with wrongfully appropriating 35 photographs made by Cariou. Several of the pieces were barely changed by Prince.  Prince also made 28 paintings that included images from Cariou’s Yes Rasta book. The book featured a series of photographs of Rastafarians that Cariou had taken in Jamaica.

On March 18, 2011, US District Judge Deborah A. Batts ruled against Prince, Gagosian Gallery, Inc., and Lawrence Gagosian.  The court found that the use by Prince was not fair use (his primary defence), and Cariou's issue of liability for copyright infringement was granted in its entirety.  The court cited much case law including the Rogers v. Koons case of 1992. On April 25, 2013, the US Court of Appeals for the Second Circuit reversed Judge Batts's ruling, stating that Prince's use of the photographs in 25 works was transformative and thus fair use. Five less transformative works were sent back to the lower court for review. The case was settled in 2014.

Appropriation of Emily Ratajkowski's Image 
In 2014, Prince appropriated one of Emily Ratajkowski's Instagram posts without her consent, and included the image in a show at the Gagosian Gallery in New York. Seven years later, Ratajkowski took a photograph of herself standing in front of the painting, and created a non-fungible token (NFT) from it. The NFT sold at auction at Christie's for $175,000. "I hope to symbolically set a precedent for women and ownership online, one that allows for women to have ongoing authority over their image and to receive rightful compensation for its usage and distribution," Ratajkowski wrote on Twitter. Ratajkowski describes the event in the popular essay for The Cut, titled "Buying Myself Back".

Works

Cowboys
Prince's series known as the Untitled Cowboys, produced from 1980 to 1992, and ongoing, is his most famous group of rephotographs. Taken from Marlboro cigarette advertisements of the Marlboro Man, they represent an idealized figure of American masculinity. The Marlboro Man was the iconic equivalent of later brands like Ralph Lauren, which used the polo pony image to identify and associate its brand. "Every week. I'd see one and be like, Oh that's mine, Thank you," Prince stated in an interview.

Prince's Cowboys displayed men in boots and ten-gallon hats, with horses, lassos, spurs and all the fixings that make up the stereotypical image of a cowboy. They were set in the Western U.S., in arid landscapes with stone outcrops flanked by cacti and tumbleweeds, with backdrops of sunsets. The advertisements were staged with the utmost attention to detail.

Prince's rephotographs of the Marlboro Man advertisements attempt to question how original and realistic the commercial depiction of a "macho man on the horse" is. Prince described his process in a 2003 interview by Steve Lafreiniere in Artforum: "I had limited technical skills regarding the camera. Actually I had no skills. I played the camera. I used a cheap commercial lab to blow up the pictures. I made editions of two. I never went into a darkroom."

While Prince re-contextualizes images by others to redefine them, he has also failed to acknowledge those preceding photographers whose work he appropriates. For the Untitled (Cowboy) Series, this includes Norm Clasen and a handful of others. Clasen has expressed being aggrieved over the failure to attribute his work saying: "If you see somebody's copied your work, there's something deep down in you that says "I'm the author of that."'

Untitled (Cowboy) has since been credited by Time Magazine as one of the "Top 100 most influential images of all time."

Jokes, Gangs, and Hoods
Prince's rephotographs led to his series known as the Gangs, which followed the same technique of appropriating images from magazines as the Cowboys did, but now the subjects moved from advertisements and mass media toward niches in American society.
Prince in this series paid homage to "sex, drugs, and rock'n'roll" in American niches, seen through magazines. He depicted the bizarre in subcultures such as the motorcycle-obsessed, hot rod enthusiasts, surfers, and heavy metal music fans. These Gangs are recognized in his series Girlfriends, featuring biker girls. A motorcycle magazine he used featured photographs of motorcyclists' girlfriends, were sprawled on their boyfriends' bikes. Prince's Gangs works are single sheets of white paper covered with a grouping or "ganging" of 9×12, 35 mm photographs. Prince did not intend any distinct relationship between the "ganged" photographs. An example can be seen in such works as his 1984 Velvet Beach, twelve Ektacolor-printed photographs of massive waves, clearly from a surf magazine. Another example is his 1986 Live Free or Die, gathering nine images of loosely dressed women on motorcycles.

Prince's made his first Joke painting circa 1985, in New York, when he was living in the back room of 303 Gallery located on Park Avenue South. The first joke represented was about psychiatrists, a subject he later worked with often. Prince described the discovery of the idea for the Joke Paintings beginning when he posted a small 11 × 14 inch handwritten joke on paper. He realized that if he had walked into a gallery and had seen it hanging from the wall, he would have been envious. Prince's Jokes come in several forms. His first Jokes were hand written, taken from joke books. His jokes grew into more substantial works as he began to incorporate them with images, often pairing jokes with images that had no relevance with one another, creating an obscure relationship. An example of one of these peculiar combinations can be seen in his 1991 Good Revolution, which depicted black and white images of a male torso in boxing shorts set amongst doodles of a kitchen stove. These were set above the text "Do you know what it means to come home at night to a woman that will give you a little love, a little affection, a little tenderness? It means you're in the wrong home, that's what it means." Another one of Prince's most well-known Joke paintings is an 80s-style red canvas painting he did in 2004 that says, "Two psychiatrists, one says to the other: I was having lunch with my mother the other day and I made a Freudian slip. I meant to say, 'Please pass the butter,' and instead it came out, 'You fucking bitch, you ruined my life.'"

In the late 1980s, Prince, like his contemporaries Lorna Simpson and Barbara Kruger, as well as many of his Conceptual Art precursors, played with image and text in a strategy that was becoming increasingly popular. Prince put jokes among cartoons, often from The New Yorker. Prince described his early discovery of jokes and his sense of humor, as "I never really started telling, I started telling them over. Back in 1985, in Venice, California, I was drawing my favorite cartoons in pencil on paper. After this I dropped the illustration or image part of the cartoon and concentrated on the punch line." Prince's jokes were primarily satirical one-liners, poking fun at topics such as religion, the relationship between husband and wife, his relations with women. The jokes are simple, often relying on a punch line: "I took my wife to a wife-swapping party, I had to throw in some cash" or "I never had a penny to my name, so I changed my name."

Jokes became the complete subject of his prints, set atop monochromatic backgrounds red, orange, blue, yellow, etc. These works range in size from 56 × 48 inches as seen in his 1994 Untitled, to 112 × 203.5 inches, as seen in his 2000 work Nuts. His early jokes were modestly sized, but as they caught on he executed larger pieces. These Monochromatic Jokes question the importance of the unique, in high art. What is it that set these jokes apart from one another, the background color, the color of the text, the jokes themselves? Compared to other Appropriation Artists working in the same time period, Prince has a distinct quality between works and series. Works are distinguishable from one another or identifiable as a particular artist, but with Prince's Monochromatic Jokes, we are presented with yellow text upon a blue background as in his 1989 Are You Kidding? Differing from Jeff Koons, for example, are not only technique and style, but also the significance given to making the artwork identifiable. In 1988 Koons was working with porcelain sculptures like his Michael Jackson and Bubbles and Pink Panther. These are two works produced in this year that are distinguishable. In the same year, 1988, are Prince's Fireman and the Drunk and his Untitled (Joke), which raise the serious question of what sets these two works apart. In a 2000 interview with Julie L. Belcove, Prince called the joke paintings "what I wanted to become known for." When asked to identify the artistic genre of his Jokes, Prince responded, "the Joke paintings are abstract. Especially in Europe, if you can't speak English."

While developing his Gang photographs and Joke paintings Prince was also making sculptural facsimiles of muscle car hoods that merged muscle car culture as a particularly American state of mind. Prince ordered classic vehicle car hoods from within custom car restoration networks and then used the hoods to cast Fiberglas molds which he washed in different colors.

Celebrities 
Celebrities is a series that plays with the American obsession with movie stars. Following Warhol's lead, Prince would search out actors' headshots, promotional photographs which frequently lack copyright protection. Prince signed them himself, using the actor's name.

Check Paintings 
The Check Paintings series is like the Celebrities. It was made possible by Prince's own interest in collecting. Prince began to seek out canceled checks from famous figures in history ranging from Jack Kerouac to Andy Warhol. He put these checks onto paint-covered canvases and often paired them with images of the individual they once belonged to.

Nurse Paintings 
The Nurse Paintings are a series inspired by the covers and titles of inexpensive novels that were commonly sold at newspaper stands and delis (pulp romance novels). Prince scanned the covers of the books on his computer and used inkjet printing to transfer the images to canvas, and then personalized the pieces with acrylic paint. They debuted in 2003 at Barbara Gladstone Galleries, who along with Larry Gagosian, represents Prince. They received mixed responses, not all selling at the asking prices of $50,000 to $60,000. Titles include Surfer Nurse, Naughty Nurse, Millionaire Nurse, and Dude Ranch Nurse, the books from which they were copied. Prince said, "The problem with art is, it's not like the game of golf, where you put the ball in the hole or you don't put the ball in the hole. There's no umpire. There's no judge. There are no rules. It's one of the problems, but it's also one of the great things about art: it becomes a question of what lasts." The Sonic Youth album Sonic Nurse used Nurse paintings, and included a song called "Dude Ranch Nurse". 

In the series of paintings, the nurses all wear caps and their mouths are covered by surgical masks, although in some of the paintings the red lips bleed through the masks. The final presentations preserve the title and nurse image from each of the book covers, though almost all else is obscured. Titles include A Nurse Involved, Aloha Nurse, Bachelor Nurse, Danger Nurse at Work, Debutant Nurse, and Doctor's Nurse.

Prince’s Nurse paintings have become by far his most expensive series, accounting for his 17 biggest results at auction as of September 2021.

Later works
Prince's series of paintings from 2007 on appear to be a throwback to more traditional genres of figurative art, and a departure from the pulpy and kitchy content of the Nurse and Jokes series. They are pornographic ink-jet prints overlaid with acrylic paint in a style trying to imitate Willem de Kooning. Prince makes the most direct treatment to the faces, hands and feet, which are bulged and distorted. These works lack the obvious linguistic re-contextualizing of the Jokes series, opting instead for a purely visual idiom.

In 2007, Prince collaborated with the fashion designer Marc Jacobs on his Spring 2008 collection for the French label Louis Vuitton.

An untitled work consists of the body of a 1970 Dodge Challenger and high-performance parts such as a 660 hp Hemi engine, custom interior, black wheel wells, 14-inch tires in the front and 16 inch in the back, a pale orange paint job with a flat black T/A hood, as well as various decals and emblems. Another car sculpture, called American Prayer, is a 1968 Dodge Charger that has been completely emptied of any engine parts and interiors and is stripped of any paint and then powder coated. In place of the engine block there is a cement block.

In Untitled (Covering Pollock), a series of 27 works made between 2009 and 2011, Prince printed black-and-white photos of Jackson Pollock taken by Hans Namuth on canvas and pasted grids of photographs showing Sid Vicious, Kate Moss, Stephanie Seymour and pornographic imagery on top. Prince adds his own Pollock-style gestures in paint around the grids.

In 2014, Prince continued his appropriation theme with an exhibit of 38 portraits at the Gagosian gallery in New York City, entitled "New Portraits." Each image was taken from his Instagram feed and included topless images of models, artists, and celebrities. Underneath the images, Prince provided comments like, "Don't du anything. Just B Urself © ®", with the copyright and registered trademark symbols likely being references to his interests in authorship. "Possible cogent responses to the show include naughty delight and sheer abhorrence", wrote art critic Peter Schjeldahl in The New Yorker. "My own was something like a wish to be dead." As with previous appropriated Prince works, the Instagram prints draw attention to the intersection of art and copyright infringement. Some of the unwilling subjects of his art, notably members of SuicideGirls, have started selling their own derivative works based on Prince derivative works of their original works.

In 2015, Prince would repeat his exhibit from Gagosian with a new exhibit for the Frieze Art Fair in NYC. However, Prince would end up making headlines due to selling the portraits for profit—at the fair, Prince sold enlargements of his Instagram feed and comments for $90,000.

In 2017, he generated controversy by returning a $36,000 payment he had received in 2014 for his portrayal of Ivanka Trump, claiming that he could not live with the idea of one of his works being in the collection of the Trump family.

Museum exhibitions
Prince has been the subject of major survey exhibitions, including the Whitney Museum of American Art, New York (1992); San Francisco Museum of Modern Art (1993); Museum Boijmans van Beuningen, Rotterdam (1993); Museum für Gegenwartskunst, Basel (2001, traveled to Kunsthalle Zürich and Kunstmuseum Wolfsburg); Solomon R. Guggenheim Museum (2007, traveled to the Walker Art Center, Minneapolis, 2008); and Serpentine Gallery, London (2008). "Richard Prince: American Prayer," an exhibition of American literature and ephemera from the artist’s collection, was on view at the Bibliothèque nationale de France, Paris in 2011. Prince's work has also appeared numerous group exhibitions, including in Bienal de São Paulo (1983), Whitney Biennial (1985, 1987, 1997, and 2004), Biennale of Sydney (1986), Venice Biennale (1988 and 2007), and documenta 9 (1992).

Personal life
Prince lives in New York with his wife, the artist Noel Grunwaldt.

Bibliography 
 O'Brien, Glenn et al. Richard Prince, Solomon R. Guggenheim Museum, New York, 2007. 
 Collings, Matthew, Richard Prince Nurse Paintings, DAP, New York, 2004. 

Women. Hatje Cantz, Berlin, 2004. 
 Rian, Jeff, Rosetta Brooks, Lucy Sante, Richard Prince, Phaidon, 2004. 
American English, Verlag der Buchhandlung Walther Konig, Cologne, 2003. . Photos of American and English first editions.
4 × 4. Korinsha Press & Co., 1997. Reprinted by Powerhouse Books, 1999. . Book of photos, also includes interview of Prince with Larry Clark.
Adult Comedy Action Drama. Scalo, 1995. . Book of photos.
 Prince, Richard. "Inside World." Kent Fine Art, New York, 1989.

See also 
 Just Another Asshole
 Metro Pictures Gallery

References

External links 
 Richard Prince: Official website includes biography, comprehensive collection of the artist's work, news and exhibition information

1949 births
20th-century American painters
American male painters
21st-century American painters
21st-century American male artists
American conceptual artists
Living people
People from Braintree, Massachusetts
Postmodern artists
Zonians
Photographers from New York City
Photographers from Massachusetts
American contemporary painters
Collage artists
20th-century American male artists